Alison Spittle is an Irish comedian, comedy writer, radio producer and actress. She has worked for iRadio, RTÉ Radio 1 and Newstalk and created sketches for Republic of Telly and has written and starred in her RTÉ Two sit-com Nowhere Fast in 2017. She is the host and creator of the Alison Spittle Show podcast hosted by headstuff.org.

Early life
Spittle was born in Harrow, London. Spittle's father was a builder. The family moved frequently, including to Dresden, Germany before moving to Spittle's mother's ancestral home of County Westmeath, Tyrrellspass, Mullingar and finally Ballymore at age 8. She attended secondary school in Moate.

Career
Graduating from college in Dublin, Spittle moved back to Westmeath where she worked as a researcher for iRadio with comedian Bernard O'Shea. She began working in comedy, supporting PJ Gallagher. This led to her participation in So You Think You're Funny's Irish heats, qualifying for rounds in Edinburgh. She got a guest spot on the "Happy Hour" section of the John Murray Show RTÉ Radio 1 from this success.

Her comedy shows have included Alison Spittle Needs an Agent, Alison Spittle Discovers Hawaii (2015), and Worrier Princess (2017). She has performed at the Edinburgh and Dublin fringe festivals, as well as The Forbidden Fruit and Cork Comedy festivals.

Spittle wrote and starred in web comedy shorts for RTÉ Two, and in sketches for Republic of Telly with Kevin McGahern.

She was a regular contributor to The Right Hook with George Hook on Newstalk. She is also a regular and well-loved co-host of The Guilty Feminist podcast with Deborah Francis-White.

She appeared in the 2019 comedy film Extra Ordinary.

In 2020, she and fellow comedian Fern Brady started a podcast for the BBC called Wheel of Misfortune. Brady left the podcast in early 2021 and Spittle hosted the show with guests until Kerry Katona became permanent co-host in November 2022.

Nowhere Fast
In 2017, she co-wrote six-part sitcom Nowhere Fast with her boyfriend Simon Mullholland. The series was directed by Simon Gibney. The show sees Angela (played by Spittle) moving back down to Ballybeag in the midlands, having lost her job on a radio show in Dublin following a high-profile libel case. The series began in November 2017, and was generally well received by critics and viewers.

References

External links
 The Alison Spittle Show podcast

Irish women comedians
Irish stand-up comedians
Living people
People from County Westmeath
Irish comedy writers
Irish television writers
Irish expatriates in England
People from Harrow, London
Women television writers
1989 births
21st-century Irish comedians
Irish women screenwriters
21st-century Irish screenwriters
Irish sketch comedians